Jimmy Daley (born 24 September 1973) is a retired English cricketer. He was a right-handed batsman and a right-hand medium-pace bowler.

Born in Sunderland, Daley's debut came during the 1992 season, for Durham. He holds a top score of 159* which he achieved in Hampshire in 1994. His first-class career lasted until the 2002 season.

External links
 at Cricinfo

1973 births
Living people
English cricketers
Durham cricketers
Cricketers from Sunderland
NBC Denis Compton Award recipients
Test and County Cricket Board XI cricketers